Aquaticitalea is a Gram-negative and rod-shaped genus of bacteria from the family of Flavobacteriaceae with one known species (Aquaticitalea lipolytica). Aquaticitalea lipolytica has been isolated from seawater from the Antarctic.

References

Flavobacteria
Bacteria genera
Monotypic bacteria genera
Taxa described in 2016